A translation of the Gospel of Matthew was made into Turkmen, by James Bassett (missionary).  This was published in 1880. He revised it in 1884 and these were published by the British and Foreign Bible Society. 

IBT has published both the New Testament and several Old Testament books in the Turkmen language, as well as a more recent complete translation of the Bible. The first recent publication was in 1994 and was of the New Testament (the 'Injil'), Psalms ('Zebur') and  Proverbs (Suleyman's Tymsals) in one  hardback volume. This edition was presented to the Language and Literature department of the Academy of Sciences in Ashgabat in November 1995 and was generally well received. It was sold widely on book tables throughout Ashgabat. Since then a paperback version of the New Testament was published, and also the  Pentateuch ('Töwrat'), and a new version of Proverbs. The whole Bible is now available online from on the IBT website www.ibt.org.ru and was published in 2016.

Comparison

References

Turkic languages
Christianity in Turkmenistan
Turkmen